Tarmo Tamm (born on 3 December 1953 in Kiuma, Põlva County) is an Estonian politician. He has been a member of the XII, XIII and XIV Riigikogu.

In 2007 he graduated from Estonian University of Life Sciences in agricultural economist.

From 1999 to 2011 he was the mayor of Põlva.

Since 2002 he is a member of Estonian Centre Party.

References

1953 births
Agriculture ministers of Estonia
Estonia 200 politicians
Estonian Centre Party politicians
Estonian University of Life Sciences alumni
Living people
Mayors of places in Estonia
Members of the Riigikogu, 2011–2015
Members of the Riigikogu, 2015–2019
Members of the Riigikogu, 2019–2023
Members of the Riigikogu, 2023–2027
People from Põlva Parish